Männedorf is a railway station in the Swiss canton of Zurich, situated in the municipality of Männedorf. The station is located on the Lake Zurich right bank railway line.

The station is served by the following passenger trains:

References

External links 

Männedorf station on Swiss Federal Railway's web site

Railway stations in the canton of Zürich
Swiss Federal Railways stations